Darío Nicolás Martínez (born 25 January 1986) is an Argentine professional footballer who plays as a defender for Los Cuervos del Fin del Mundo.

Career
Martínez's senior career began with Los Andes. He made thirty-eight appearances for them in three years across seasons in Primera B Nacional and Primera B Metropolitana, netting two goals in the process; with his final goal for the club coming in the third tier on 10 April 2010 against Villa San Carlos. In 2016, Martínez featured for Racing de Trelew in Torneo Federal B. A division he remained in for the following year, joining Los Cuervos del Fin del Mundo from the 2017 campaign. A total of twelve appearances arrived across both stints.

Career statistics
.

References

External links

1986 births
Living people
Footballers from Buenos Aires
Argentine footballers
Association football defenders
Primera B Metropolitana players
Primera Nacional players
Club Atlético Los Andes footballers
Racing de Trelew players